Praxithea thomsonii is a species of beetle in the family Cerambycidae. It was described by Chabrillac in 1857.

References

Torneutini
Beetles described in 1857